Charles Barkley (born 1963) is an American former basketball player and sports analyst.

Charles Barkley may also refer to:
Charles E. Barkley (born 1950), American politician
Charles William Barkley (1759–1832), English ship captain and fur trader

See also
Charles Barclay (disambiguation)
Charles Berkeley (disambiguation)